The Kabul hoard, also called the Chaman Hazouri, Chaman Hazouri or Tchamani-i Hazouri hoard, is a coin hoard discovered in the vicinity of Kabul, Afghanistan in 1933. The collection contained numerous Achaemenid coins as well as many Greek coins from the 5th and 4th centuries BCE. Approximately one thousand coins were counted in the hoard. The deposit of the hoard is dated to approximately 380 BCE, as this is the probable date of the least ancient datable coin found in the hoard (the imitation of the Athenian owl tetradrachm).

This numismatic discovery has been important in studying and dating the history of the coinage of India, since it is one of the very rare instances when punch-marked coins can actually be dated, due to their association with known and dated Greek and Achaemenid coins in the hoard. The hoard proves that punch-marked coins existed in 360 BCE, as also suggested by literary evidence. According to numismatist Joe Cribb,  it suggests that the idea of coinage and the use of punch-marked techniques was introduced to India from the Achaemenid Empire during the 4th century BCE. However, numerous Indian scholars see the development of coinage in the Gangetic plains as an indigenous development.

Historical context

The Kabul valley and the region of Gandhara to the west of Indus came under the Achaemenid rule during the reign of Cyrus the Great (600–530 BCE). Jointly, the region was known by its Iranian name Paruparaesanna as well as the Indian name Gandara. It was administered at first from Bactria, but organised into a separate satrapy in  BCE with a headquarters possibly at Pushkalavati (near present-day Charsadda in Pakistan). It was a tribute-paying region until the time of Artaxerxes (424 BCE), but it remained part of the royal conception of the empire until Alexander's conquest ( BCE). At Alexander's time, the region was said to be governed by hyparchs (rulers in their own right, but professing subjection to the emperor). The nature of the local administration under the Achaemenid empire is uncertain. Magee et al. note that neither the Achaemenid nor classical sources mention the presence of any satraps in Gandara. However, there were official personages encountered by Alexander's companions.

Coinage was developed by the Greeks of the Asia Minor, influenced by the Lydian coinage in the 7th century BCE. Over the next two centuries, the use of coins spread throughout the Mediterranean area.  The Achaemenid conquest of Asia minor in 540 BCE made no immediate difference to the situation: the Greek coinage continued under the Achaemenid rule and the Iranian heartland itself had little use for money. Daris I introduced new Achaemenid coins, gold darics and silver sigloi, primarily as replacements for the Lydian coins in the Asia minor. While the darics proved to be popular, the sigloi did not catch on. The Greek cities continued to mint their own silver coins. A mix of these Greek silver coins and the Achaemenid sigloi thus began to circulate throughout the Achaemenid empire, the Greek coins generally being in a majority.

Discovery and storage of the hoard

The hoard was discovered by a construction team in 1933 when digging for foundations for a house near the Chaman-i Hazouri park in central Kabul. According to the then director of Délégation Archéologique Française en Afghanistan (DAFA), the hoard contained about 1,000 silver coins and some jewellery. 127 coins and pieces of jewellery were taken to the Kabul Museum and others made their way to various museums in British India and elsewhere. Some two decades later, Daniel Schlumberger of DAFA published photographs and details of the finds stored in the Kabul Museum in a book titled Trésors Monétaires d'Afghanistan.

The Chaman-i-Hazouri coins remained at the Kabul Museum until 1992–1993, at which time the Mujahideen fighting the Afghan civil war plundered the museum. All the coins were lost (along with various other artifacts). Some two years later, 14 coins from the collection surfaced in a private collection in Pakistan. Osmund Bopearachchi and Aman ur Rahman published their details in the book Pre-Kushana Coins in Pakistan (1995).

Description of the hoard

The hoard suggests, together with other coin finds in the areas of Afghanistan and Pakistan that Greek coins had found their way to India, at least as far as the Indus, well before the conquests of Alexander the Great. This happened under the rule of the Achaemenids. The Achaemenid sigloi themselves were a small minority, just as in the hoards from other parts of the empire.

Daniel Schlumberger published descriptions of 115 coins from those in the Kabul Museum. They included 30 coins from various Greek cities, about 33 Athenian coins and an Iranian imitation of an Athenian coin, 9 royal Achaemenid silver coins (siglos), 29 locally minted coins of said to be of a "new kind" and 14 punch-marked coins in the shape of bent bars. It seems that the Classical Greek and Achaemenid coins were imported from the west.

Achaemenid siglos coins

Several Achaemenid siglos coins were found in the hoards of Kabul (deposit dated circa 350 BCE) and Bhir Mound hoard of Taxila (deposit dated circa 300 BCE), which were evidently transmitted from the western part of the Achaemenid Empire. They typically show a crowned Achaemenid king running to right, holding bow and spear (Archer king type), with a rectangular punch-mark on the reverse. The several coin hoards discovered in the East of the Achaemenid Empire generally have very few sigloi, suggesting that the circulation of Sigloi was actually quite small compared to the circulation of Greek coinage (both Archaic and early Classical) in those part of the Empire.

Coins of this type were also found in the Bhir Mound hoard of Taxila.

Greek coins

The Greek coins recorded in the hoard were 30 coins from various Greek cities and about 34 from Athens with one Iranian imitation. Generally, Greek coins (both Archaic and early Classical) are comparatively very numerous in the Achaemenid coin hoards discovered in the East of the Achaemenid Empire, much more numerous than sigloi, suggesting that the circulation of Greek coinage was central in the monetary system of those part of the Empire.
Archaic Greek coin types from the Kabul hoard
The Kabul hoard contained some archaic Greek coin types (minted before 480 BCE), among them: archaic staters from Aegina, Thasos and Chios. These early coins were made using a die on the obverse with an illustrative design, while the back was formed with simple geometric punch-marks.

Early classical Greek coin types from the Kabul hoard
In addition, there were two early classical tetradrachms from Akanthos as well as a stater from Corcyra. There were also coins from the cities of Levant: Pamphylia, Cilicia and Cyprus. Numismatist J. Kagan states that these coins must have reached the Kabul area soon after they were minted.

Bopearachchi and Cribb state that these coins "demonstrate in a tangible way the depth of Greek penetration in the century before Alexander the Great's conquest of the Achaemenid satrapies." According to Joe Cribb, these early Greek coins were at the origin of Indian punch-marked coins, the earliest coins developed in India, which used minting technology derived from Greek coinage.

Round punch-marked coins

Schlumberger labelled 29 round punch-marked coins found in the hoard as being "of a new kind", not found elsewhere. They are round or elliptic/ cup-shaped coins of the Achaemenid weight standard, struck with one, two or several punches.
They usually display a sort of arrow symbol on the obverse, and circular geometric symbols on the reverse. Similar coins have also been found in the Shaikhan Dehri hoard in Pushkalavati in the center of the Gandhara area, but not in Taxila.

Their dispersal in Kabul and Pushakalavati led Bopearachchi to postulate that they were manufactured locally, while the region was under Achaemenid protection, during the 5th century BCE. Some scholars also believe them to have been a "product of the local Achaemenid administration".  However, others state that the local administration was largely autonomous and followed an independent monetary policy. According to Joe Cribb, these coins were locally made imitations of Greek coins, with some pictorial, but mostly non-pictorial designs, using weight standards derived from Greek and Persian coinage.

According Bopearachchi, these coins illustrate the transition from regular round coinage to Indian punch-marked coins. First, these coins have been shown to be the chronological predecessors of and bent and punch-marked coins. Second, they were minted according to the Achaemenid weight standard of 1 siglos (5.5 grams), or 2 siglos (11 grams).

Design evolution of the round coins

Lastly, the round coins in the Kabul hoard display a marked evolution in design: the series starts with simple round coins struck on the obverse and reverse with animal motifs reminding of the "western designs" of Croesus, or Achaemenid motifs. In particular, the round coins which are considered the oldest in the hoard, have an obverse design consisting in the facing busts of two bulls, evocative of the design of the mid-6th century coins of Croesus with the facing busts of a lion and a bull, generally considered as the first coins ever to be minted. Other western designs include a stag, or double Persian column capitals.

In later coins, the obverse design is progressively abandoned, and the reverse becomes a punch mark which progressively evolves to more symbolic motifs (such as the cup-like coins with lines around a central circle), before reaching a stage were the round coins are struck with multiple punches.

In summary, these coins were "the precursors of the bent and punch-marked coins", and "the use of independent punches is at the origin of the striking of Indian "coins with multiple punch-marks". Mauryan kings later issued descendants of these very coins in the territories south of the Hindu Kush for local circulation.

Short punch-marked bent-bars

The round punch-marked coins have been shown to precede chronologically the "bent bars", also minted under Achaemenid rule from Bactria to the Punjab. The practice of using unmarked silver bars for currency is known from the Iranian plateau and seems to have been current in Central Asia under the Achaemenid Empire.  The bent bars are believed to have been derived from that practice, representing "a marriage between Greek coinage and Iranian bar currency".

The short "bars with punch-marks" (28x15mm) discovered in Chaman Hazouri are attributed to the Paropamisadae by Bopearachchi. Their design uses two circular symbols punched at each end of one face of the bar. These bent bars are clearly reminiscent of later punch-marked Indian types, which use several of the designs of these coins "of a new kind". The "long bars" with punch marks (42x10mm), of which none were found in the Kabul hoard, are attributed to the area of Gandhara, as well as in the Bhir Mound hoard in Taxila.

Development of Indian punch-marked coins

According to Joe Cribb the earliest punched-marked bent-bars are found in the northwest of the continent, and their simple designs was then adopted in the Gangetic plains, before designs evolved there towards the usage of more numerous punches on each coin. This is also proven by the fact that the Gangetic plains have no known coin designs anterior to their simple punch-marked bars, whereas the Kabul/Gandhara punch-marked bars were preceded there by the round punch-marked coins with symbols, minted under the Achaemenids.

Daniel Schlumberger too considers probable that punch-marked bars, similar to the many punch-marked bars found in northwestern India, initially originated in the Achaemenid Empire, rather than in the Indian heartland:

Impact on the dating of Indian punched-marked coins

There is uncertainty regarding the actual time punch-marked coinage started in India, with proposals ranging from 1000 BCE to 500 BCE. However, the study of the relative chronology of these coins has successfully established that the first punch-marked coins initially only had one or two punches, with the number of punches increasing over time.

According to Joe Cribb, the study of the Chaman Hazouri hoard suggests that Indian punch-marked coins may only go back to the mid-4th century BCE or slightly earlier, and actually started with the punch-marked coinage of the Achaemenids in the Kabul/Gandhara area. This date remains consistent with various literary works mentioning the usage of coinage in India. This early design was then adopted in the Gangetic plains to evolve towards multi-punch-marked coins.

Another find that can be dated was made in Kausambi, where silver-plated forgeries imitating the early types of punch-marked coins and bars from Chaman Hazouri were found in the Mauryan Empire levels associated with the Pillar of Ashoka that can be found there. This is another indication that the earliest punch-marked coins only date from around the mid-4th century BCE, and that they were still the standard coinage of reference at the time of the early Mauryan Empire (mid-3rd century CE).

However, historian Romila Thapar has stated that the punch-marked coins were in circulation before the Mauryan rule and the general opinion adheres to the 6th century BCE as the date of their introduction.

Connected findings
In 2007 a small coin hoard was discovered at the site of ancient Pushkalavati (Shaikhan Dehri hoard) in Pakistan. The hoard contained a tetradrachm minted in Athens circa 500/490-485/0 BCE, together with a number of local types as well as silver cast ingots. The Athens coin is the earliest known example of its type to be found so far to the east.

See also

 Coinage of India
 Ghazzat hoard

References

Bibliography

External links
Photographic inventory of the Kabul hoard in the Kabul Museum (now disappeared after looting in 1992-1994), by Daniel Schlumberger in Trésors Monétaires d'Afghanistan (1953):
Kabul hoard Greek coins (photograph)
Kabul hoard Greek and Persian coins (photograph)
Kabul hoard Local coins (photograph)
Kabul hoard Local coins (photograph)
Kabul hoard, various fragments (photograph)
An attempt at classification

Ancient history of Afghanistan
History of Kabul
Kabul
Archaeological discoveries in Afghanistan
Treasure troves of Asia